Luvsanlkhündegiin Otgonbayar, (born July 13, 1982) is a Mongolian athlete. She has represented her country by running the marathon at competitions such as the 2004 Summer Olympics, the 2006 Asian Games, the 2007 World Championships and the 2012 Summer Olympics.

Career
Born in Ulaanbaatar, she achieved a degree of fame during the 2004 Olympics by completing the marathon, with a time 3:48:42, despite having dropped half an hour or more behind all the other competitors. Time magazine reported:
By 10 p.m. the race wasn't a race at all, just a solitary Mongolian inching along the track. Otgonbayar, the 22-year-old daughter of camel and sheep herders, didn't so much run into the historic stadium as microshuffle in, with a gait so unhurried that the thousands of cheering spectators could be forgiven for thinking the world had paused or, at the very least, shifted into super slo-mo. […] Motion doesn't get any more triumphal than the descendants of Genghis Khan racing through the grasslands, in pursuit of the true Olympic spirit.

Similarly to Time, the BBC celebrated Otgonbayar as one of the "unsung heroes" of the Olympics. The Marquette Tribune reported that the "Mongolian Luvsanlkhundeg Otgonbayar limped across the finish line 30 minutes after the second slowest runner" while "the remaining crowd clapped in unison as she approached the final 100 meters on her way to finishing the race." The newspaper suggested that she had thus "followed in the footsteps of Pheidippides", running the marathon with notable "courage".

Describing her performance, Otgonbayar said:
''"The sound of all the clapping from the fans pushed me forward, and I felt like I was running very fast. Even if I finished last, it was all right, because I still finished and many people, even famous people, didn't do that."

In 2015, she finished 11th at the Hamburg Marathon with a personal best of 2:38.

Achievements

See also
 Pyambuugiin Tuul, another Mongolian athlete who completed an Olympic marathon but finished last
 Abdul Baser Wasiqi, Afghan Olympic marathoner in 1996, who finished last and constituted his country's entire Olympic team

References

External links
 
 

1982 births
Living people
Mongolian female long-distance runners
Athletes (track and field) at the 2004 Summer Olympics
Athletes (track and field) at the 2012 Summer Olympics
Athletes (track and field) at the 2016 Summer Olympics
Olympic athletes of Mongolia
Athletes (track and field) at the 2006 Asian Games
Athletes (track and field) at the 2010 Asian Games
People from Ömnögovi Province
Mongolian female marathon runners
World Athletics Championships athletes for Mongolia
Asian Games competitors for Mongolia
21st-century Mongolian women